Thomas Joseph Mardaga (May 14, 1913 – May 28, 1984) was an American prelate of the Roman Catholic Church. He served as bishop of the Diocese of Wilmington in Delaware from 1968 until his death in 1984.  He previously served as an auxiliary bishop of the Archdiocese of Baltimore in Maryland from 1966 to 1968.

Biography

Early life 
Thomas Mardaga was born on May 14, 1913, in Baltimore, Maryland, to Thomas and Agnes (née Ryan) Mardaga. He received his early education at the parochial school of St. Ann Parish in Baltimore. He attended St. Charles College in Catonsville, Maryland before studying for the priesthood at St. Mary's Seminary in Baltimore. 

Mardaga was ordained a priest for the Archdiocese of Baltimore by Archbishop Michael J. Curley on May 14, 1940.Mardaga then served as a curate at St. Paul Parish in Baltimore until being transferred to the Basilica of the Assumption, where he later became rector. In addition to his pastoral work, he served as archdiocesan director of the Catholic Youth Organization and the Confraternity of Christian Doctrine, executive secretary of the Catholic Charities Fund, and a member of the archdiocesan board of consultors. Mardaga was named a domestic prelate by the Vatican in 1963.

Auxiliary Bishop of Baltimore 
On December 9, 1966, Mardaga was appointed auxiliary bishop of the Archdiocese of Baltimore and titular bishop of Mutugenna by Pope Paul VI. He received his episcopal consecration on January 25, 1967, from Cardinal Lawrence Shehan, with Bishops John Russell and Thomas Murphy serving as co-consecrators, at the Cathedral of Mary Our Queen in Baltimore. As an auxiliary bishop, he continued to serve as rector of the Basilica of the Assumption.

Bishop of Wilmington 
Following the death of Bishop Michael Hyle, Mardaga was named the sixth bishop of the Diocese of Wilmington on March 9, 1968. His installation took place at St. Elizabeth Church in Wilmington, Delaware on April 6, 1968. During his 16-year tenure, Mardaga continued the implementation of the reforms of the Second Vatican Council, establishing a council for the laity and participating in ecumenical work. He also reorganized the diocesan curia and created a ministry for migrant workers.

Thomas Mardaga died on May 28, 1984, at age 71 from cancer at St. Francis Hospital in Wilmington.

References

1913 births
1984 deaths
St. Charles College alumni
St. Mary's Seminary and University alumni
Roman Catholic bishops of Wilmington
20th-century Roman Catholic bishops in the United States